The Basic Points Unifying the Theravāda and the Mahāyāna  is an important Buddhist ecumenical statement created in 1967 during the First Congress of the World Buddhist Sangha Council (WBSC), where its founder Secretary-General, the late Venerable Pandita Pimbure Sorata Thera, requested the Ven. Walpola Rahula to present a concise formula for the unification of all the different Buddhist traditions. This text was then unanimously approved by the Council.

Text of the original document 

{{cquote|
 The Buddha is our only Master (teacher and guide)
 We do not believe that this world is created and ruled by a God.
We accept the thirty-seven qualities conducive to enlightenment as different aspects of the Path taught by the Buddha leading to Enlightenment. There are three ways of attaining bodhi or Enlightenment: namely as a disciple (śrāvaka), as a pratyekabuddha and as a samyaksambuddha (perfectly and fully enlightened Buddha). We accept it as the highest, noblest, and most heroic to follow the career of a Bodhisattva and to become a samyaksambuddha in order to save others. We admit that in different countries there are differences regarding Buddhist beliefs and practices. These external forms and expressions should not be confused with the essential teachings of the Buddha.}}

 Expansion of the formula 
Ven. Walpola Sri Rahula in 1981  offered an alternative to the Nine-point formula above restating it as follows:

 See also 
 Index of Buddhism-related articles
 Secular Buddhism
 World Buddhist Forum
 World Fellowship of Buddhists

 Notes 

 References 
 Rahula, Walpola (1974). The Heritage of the Bhikkhu''. NY: Grove Press; pp. 100, 137-8. 
 The Young Buddhist, Singapore : Buddha Yana Organization, 1982, p. 161 -163

External links 
 World Buddhist Sangha Council homepage
 Comparative Study by Tan Swe Eng
 Theravada vs Mahayana (Compiled by Oo Maung)

Buddhist philosophy
Comparative Buddhism
20th-century Buddhism